Lindsaeineae is a suborder of ferns (Polypodiopsida), order Polypodiales, created by the Pteridophyte Phylogeny Group (2016). It consists of two monogeneric families plus the larger Lindsaeaceae with seven genera, and the suborder contains about 237 species overall. It corresponds to Lindsaeaceae sensu Smith 2016.

Description 
The rhizomes are short to long, creeping but rarely ascending, covered with non-clathrate scales (rarely hairs). The petioles are single, rarely double (sometimes several fusing into two in the upper part of the stipe). They contain vascular bundles and the sori are marginal to sub-marginal, generally protected by laminar true indusia (rarely marginal pseudo-indusia or both).

Taxonomy 
Lindsaeineae are placed within the Polypodiales and are phylogenetically related to the other five suborders as shown in this cladogram:

Subdivision 
Lindsaeineae contains three families:

 Cystodiaceae J.R.Croft monotypic Cystodium sorbifolium
 Lindsaeaceae C.Presl ex M.R.Schomb. Seven genera, and an estimated 234 species 
 Lonchitidaceae Doweld monogeneric Lonchitis 2 species

The three families constituting the Lindsaeineae are related as follows:

References

Bibliography 

 
 
 
 
 
 
 
 
 
 , in 

Polypodiales